Afrocoscinia is a curious genus of tiger moths in the family Erebidae erected by Vladimir Viktorovitch Dubatolov in 2011. The genus includes only one species, Afrocoscinia aethiopica, described by Lars Kühne in 2010, which is found in the arid regions of the western part of South Africa. By the general appearance of wing and body shape, it looks like species of the Palearctic genus Coscinia from Callimorphina. But many other characteristics of this moth show that is it a member of the Nyctemerina.

References

Endemic moths of South Africa
Nyctemerina
Monotypic moth genera
Moths described in 2011
Moths of Africa